Rajakeeya Maha Vidyalaya, Telijjawila (also known as Royal College, Telijjawila or Telijjawila Royal College) is a provincial school in Telijjawila near Matara, Sri Lanka.

The first principal of the girls' section was Mrs. Lilie Samawathie Abeysekara, while the boys' section principal was Mr. Don Robert Dharmawardana. Principal Mr. P.B. Jinadasa renamed the school Rajakeeya Maha Vidyalaya-Telijjawila. At present, the school has a well-equipped library, a modern computer lab, an audio and video unit and commerce and arts sections for G.C.E (A/L). The student population is about 2,500, and has the largest number of student population in the Akuressa educational zone.

See also
 List of schools in Southern Province, Sri Lanka

References

External links
 

Educational institutions established in 1910
Provincial schools in Sri Lanka
Schools in Matara District
1910 establishments in Ceylon